Ernst August Friedrich Ruska (25 December 1906 – 27 May 1988) was a German physicist who won the Nobel Prize in Physics in 1986 for his work in electron optics, including the design of the first electron microscope.

Life and career
Ernst Ruska was born in Heidelberg, Germany. He was educated at the Technical University of Munich from 1925 to 1927 and then entered the Technical University of Berlin, where he posited that microscopes using electrons, with wavelengths 1000 times shorter than those of light, could provide a more detailed picture of an object than a microscope utilizing light, in which magnification is limited by the size of the wavelengths. In 1931, he demonstrated that a magnetic coil could act as an electron lens, and used several coils in a series to build the first electron microscope in 1933.

After completing his PhD in 1933, Ruska continued to work in the field of electron optics, first at Fernseh AG in Berlin-Zehlendorf, and then from 1937 at Siemens-Reiniger-Werke AG. At Siemens, he was involved in developing the first commercially produced electron microscope in 1939. As well as developing the technology of electron microscopy while at Siemens, Ruska also worked at other scientific institutions, and encouraged Siemens to set up a laboratory for visiting researchers, which was initially headed by Ruska's brother Helmut, a medical doctor who developed the use of the electron microscope for medical and biological applications.

After leaving Siemens in 1955, Ruska served as director of the Institute for Electron Microscopy of the Fritz Haber Institute until 1974. Concurrently, he served at the institute and as professor at the Technical University of Berlin from 1957 until his retirement in 1974.

In 1960 he won the Lasker Award. In 1986, he was awarded half of the Nobel Prize in Physics for his many achievements in electron optics; Gerd Binnig and Heinrich Rohrer won a quarter each for their design of the scanning tunneling microscope. He died in West Berlin in 1988.

Asteroid 1178 Irmela, discovered by Max Wolf, is named after Ruska's wife Irmela, who was Wolf's niece.

References

External links
Nobel Prize press release
 including the Nobel Lecture, December 8, 1986 The Development of the Electron Microscope and of Electron Microscopy
Website containing memorial information published by the Ruska family

1906 births
1988 deaths
Scientists from Heidelberg
People from the Grand Duchy of Baden
20th-century German physicists
Technical University of Munich alumni
Nobel laureates in Physics
20th-century German inventors
German Nobel laureates
Microscopists
Max Planck Society people
Recipients of the Albert Lasker Award for Basic Medical Research
Grand Crosses with Star and Sash of the Order of Merit of the Federal Republic of Germany
Presidents of the International Federation of Societies for Microscopy
Technical University of Berlin alumni
Academic staff of the Technical University of Berlin
Academic staff of the Free University of Berlin
Burials at the Waldfriedhof Zehlendorf
Max Planck Institute directors